Aberdeen Municipal Airport  is a city-owned public-use airport located two nautical miles (3.7 km) southwest of the central business district of Aberdeen, a city in Bingham County, Idaho, United States.  According to the FAA's National Plan of Integrated Airport Systems for 2009–2013, it is categorized as a general aviation facility.

Facilities and aircraft 
It has one runway designated 7/25 with an asphalt surface measuring 3,690 by 50 feet (1,113 x 15 m).

For the 12-month period ending April 7, 2009, the airport had 8,000 general aviation aircraft operations, an average of 21 per day. At that time there were 8 aircraft based at this airport: 75% single-engine and 25% multi-engine.

References

External links 
 Aerial image as of 24 May 1992 from USGS The National Map
 Aberdeen Municipal Airport (U36) at Idaho Transportation Department Airport Directory
 

Airports in Idaho
Buildings and structures in Bingham County, Idaho
Transportation in Bingham County, Idaho